Cross International is a Christian charity focused on alleviating poverty primarily in Latin America, Africa and the Caribbean.  Headquartered in Pompano Beach, Florida, it is a 501(c)3 organization

Cross supplies food, water, shelter, medical care, educational support and self-help resources through a network of Christian churches and ministries overseas.

Countries of operation

Cross Board and Leadership 

 Kelly Miller - President
 Zach Oles - Director of International Programs
 Lenora Foster-Branch - Chief Administrative Officer

Board of Directors 

 Rev. Jimmy Dodd - Chairman
 Dr. Joe White - Secretary & Director
 Kelly Miller - Director
 Darrell Borne - Director
 Mike Eissey - Director
 Mr. Antoninus Hines - Director
 Dr. Mark Montoney - Director
 Cedric Wade - Director
 Will Walton - Director

References 

Christian charities based in the United States
Religious organizations based in the United States
Christian organizations established in the 20th century
Development charities based in the United States
Christian organizations established in 2001
Pompano Beach, Florida
2001 establishments in Florida
Charities based in Florida